The London Buddhist Vihara (Sinhala:ලන්ඩන් බෞද්ධ විහාරය Landan Bauddha Viharaya) is one of the main Theravada Buddhist temples in the United Kingdom. The Vihara was the first Sri Lankan Buddhist monastery to be established outside Asia.

Established in 1926, the Vihara is managed by the Anagarika Dharmapala Trust in Colombo. The current chief bhikkhu of the Vihara is Ven Bogoda Seelawimala Nayaka Thera, who is also the Chief Sangha Nayaka of Great Britain.

The Vihara building, Grade II listed, was the social club for the Bedford Park garden suburb until 1939. The building was designed by Norman Shaw; the interior, now much modified, was by Edward John May.

History

The London Buddhist Vihara was founded in 1926 by Anagarika Dharmapala.

One of the temple's main benefactors during its early days was Mary Foster, who financed ‘Foster House’ in Ealing. This was the first Sri Lankan Buddhist temple established outside Asia and was named the London Buddhist Vihara in 1926. Shortly afterwards, the Vihara moved to Gloucester Road in the Royal Borough of Kensington and Chelsea, where it continued until the Second World War. During the war, the temple premises were requisitioned, and the monks returned to Ceylon.

In 1955, the Vihara reopened in Ovington Square, Knightsbridge under the initiative of Sir Cyril de Zoysa. 
Narada Nayaka Thera became the chief bhikkhu of the Vihara in 1958. The Vihara moved to Heathfield Gardens, Chiswick in 1964. Hammalawa Saddhatissa Nayaka Thera subsequently became the chief Bhikkhu of the Vihara and was succeeded in 1985 by  Dr Medagama Vajiragnana Nayaka Thera.

In 1994, The Vihara moved to its present premises at The Avenue, Chiswick. Ven Bogoda Seelawimala Nayaka Thera was appointed as the chief bhikkhu in May 2008. The London Buddhist Vihara has several resident bhikkhus from Sri Lanka, and conducts and actively engages in religious Buddhist activities in the region.

Building

The Vihara building was the social club for the Bedford Park garden suburb until 1939. The architect, Richard Norman Shaw, designed the exterior in 1877-8; the interior, now much modified, was by the architect Edward John May. The building was Grade II listed in 1970.

See also

 Hammalawa Saddhatissa
 Maha Bodhi Society
 Wat Buddhapadipa
 Buddhism in the United Kingdom
 Buddhism in Europe

References

External links

London Buddhist Vihara 90th Anniversary & Anagarika Dharmapala Tribute by Mr.Amal Abeyawardene

Buddhist monasteries in England
Buddhist temples in London
Buildings and structures in Chiswick
Chiswick
Grade II listed buildings in the London Borough of Ealing
Religion in the London Borough of Ealing
Sri Lankan diaspora
Theravada Buddhist monasteries
1926 establishments in England